Nakapiripirit is a town in the Nakapiripirit District of the Northern Region of Uganda. It is the seat of the district headquarters. The town is an administrative unit of the district, at the level of a sub-county; one of the eight sub-counties in the district.

Location
The coordinates of Nakapiripirit Town are 01°51'08.0"N 34°43'17.0"E (Latitude:1.852222; Longitude:34.721389).

Population
The 2002 national population census estimated the population of the town at 1,640. In 2010, the Uganda Bureau of Statistics (UBOS) estimated the mid-year population at 2,600. In 2011, UBOS estimated the population at 2,800. The 2014 population census enumerated the population of the town at 3,727 people.

Points of interest
The following additional points of interest lie in Nakapiripirit or near its borders: (a) offices of Nakapiripirit Town Council (b) Nakapiripirit central market (c) Moroto–Nakapiripirit Road, passes through the middle of town, where it links up with Muyembe–Nakapiripirit Road.

Hill View Resort, located in town and overlooking Mount Kadam, offers accommodation, meals and entertainment.

See also
List of cities and towns in Uganda

References

External links
Water Crisis Hits Nakapiripirit
Nakapiripirit Gets Power As of 31 August 2010.

Populated places in Northern Region, Uganda
Nakapiripirit District
Karamoja